Jean Namayega Sseninde, (born 4 December 1992), also Jean Sseninde, is a Ugandan footballer who played as a defender for the Queens Park Rangers W.F.C. in the FA Women's National League South.

Background and education
Sseninde was born in the Central Region of Uganda on 4 December 1992. Her mother is Rosemary Sseninde, the State Minister for Primary Education in the Ugandan Cabinet, who also concurrently serves as the Wakiso District Women's Representative in the Parliament of Uganda. Namayega attended local elementary schools for her primary education. She went to Gayaza High School for her O-Level studies. She transferred to Saint Mary's School Kitende, where she completed her A-Level education.

Career
Following her graduation from Kitende, Sseninde sought counsel from Majida Nantanda, the head coach of the Uganda women's national soccer team. Nantanda recommended that Jean should join a professional football club in England, through the Federation of Uganda Football Associations (FUFA). Prior to joining the London Phoenix Ladies FC, Jean played for the Charlton Athletic Women's Football Club, for one season. Before that, she played for the Queens Park Rangers Ladies Football Club (QPRLFC), for three seasons.

Other consideration
Sseninde is a member of Common Goal, an organisation whose members pledge to give away at least one percent of their annual salary to charity. She founded the Jean Sseninde Foundation, which sponsors the annual Jean Sseninde Women Football Development Tournament, aimed at discovering and mentoring female soccer talent in Uganda.

References

External links
 Jean Sseninde – Giving the Underprivileged a Chance at Football in Uganda

1992 births
Living people
Ganda people
People educated at Gayaza High School
Ugandan women's footballers
Women's association football defenders
People from Wakiso District
People from Central Region, Uganda
20th-century Ugandan women
21st-century Ugandan women
Expatriate footballers in England